Surrey Docks is a largely residential area of Rotherhithe in south-east London, occupied until 1970 by the Surrey Commercial Docks.. The precise boundaries of the area are somewhat amorphous, but it is generally considered to comprise the southern half of the Rotherhithe peninsula from Canada Water to South Dock; electorally, Surrey Docks is the eastern half of the peninsula. The area is served by Surrey Quays railway station. The Docks are called Surrey Docks because until 1889 the borders of Surrey and Kent met in this area.

History 
After the closure of the docks, the area remained derelict for over a decade, with much of the warehousing demolished and over 90% of the docks filled in. The only surviving areas of open water were Greenland Dock, South Dock, part of Canada Dock (renamed Canada Water), remnants of Norway Dock, and a basin renamed Surrey Water. In 1981, the Conservative government of Prime Minister Margaret Thatcher established the London Docklands Development Corporation to redevelop the former dockyard areas of east London, including the Surrey Docks.

The Surrey Quays shopping centre was built in 1988.  The Surrey Docks Underground station was renamed Surrey Quays. A massive building programme took place in the area during the late 1980s and early 1990s with 5,500 new homes being built, ranging from individual detached housing to large apartment complexes, such as Baltic Quay. South Dock was converted into a marina – now the largest in London – and a sailing facility (named Surrey Docks Watersports Centre) was constructed on Greenland Dock. The northern part of Canada Water and the infilled Russia Dock became wildlife reserves. Leisure facilities and a number of light industrial plants were also built, notably a new printing works for Associated Newspapers, the publisher of the London Evening Standard and the Daily Mail. This site was the headquarters of Metro (British newspaper) from its launch in 1999 until 2006, when the newspaper's production was relocated to Kensington, west London. A further phase of development at Canada Water began around 2005 and is still underway. The location of Canada Water Surrey Quays lends its name to local property developer CWSQ.

Since 2007 there have been campaigns to change the name of railway station, back to Surrey Docks.

Transport and locale
The nearest London Underground station and London Overground station is Canada Water on the Jubilee line, and the next nearest station on the London Overground is Surrey Quays.

Greenland Dock Pier is the nearest place for boarding London River Services, operated by Thames Clippers.

References

External links
 LDDC Completion Booklet – Surrey Docks
 Surrey Quays Shopping Centre on The Retail Database

 
Areas of London
Districts of the London Borough of Southwark